Star News may refer to:

 ABP News (previously STAR News), an Indian news channel
 Pasadena Star-News, a paid local daily newspaper for Pasadena, California
 Star-News, the daily newspaper for Wilmington, North Carolina
 Star-News (Elk River, Minnesota), a weekly newspaper in Elk River, Minnesota
 The Star-News (Chula Vista), a community newspaper in Southern California
 Star News Asia, the flagship daily evening television news programmes from Hong Kong on STAR World
 Star-News, a website about South Korean celebrity singers, actors, and entertainers

See also
 News Star (disambiguation)
 Sin Poh (disambiguation)
 Sing Pao (disambiguation)